The Latin-1 Supplement (also called C1 Controls and Latin-1 Supplement) is the second Unicode block in the Unicode standard. It encodes the upper range of ISO 8859-1: 80 (U+0080) - FF (U+00FF). C1 Controls (0080–009F) are not graphic. This block ranges from U+0080 to U+00FF, contains 128 characters and includes the C1 controls, Latin-1 punctuation and symbols, 30 pairs of majuscule and minuscule accented Latin characters and 2 mathematical operators.

The C1 controls and Latin-1 Supplement block has been included in its present form, with the same character repertoire since version 1.0 of the Unicode Standard. Its block name in Unicode 1.0 was simply Latin1.

Character table

Subheadings
The C1 Controls and Latin-1 Supplement block has four subheadings within its character collection: C1 controls, Latin-1 Punctuation and Symbols, Letters, and Mathematical operator(s).

C1 controls
The C1 controls subheading contains 32 supplementary control codes inherited from ISO/IEC 8859-1 and many other 8-bit character standards. The alias names for the C0 and C1 control codes are taken from ISO/IEC 6429:1992.

Latin-1 punctuation and symbols
The Latin-1 Punctuation and Symbols subheading contains 32 characters of common international punctuation characters, such as inverted exclamation and question marks, and a middle dot; and symbols like currency signs, spacing diacritic marks, vulgar fraction, and superscript numbers.

Letters
The Letters subheading contains 30 pairs of majuscule and minuscule accented or novel Latin characters for western European languages, and two extra minuscule characters not commonly used word-initially.

Mathematical operator
The Mathematical operator subheading is used for the multiplication and division signs.

Number of symbols, letters and control codes
The table below shows the number of each letters, symbols and control codes in each subheadings in the C1 Controls and Latin-1 Supplement block.

Compact table

Emoji
The Latin-1 Supplement block contains two emoji:
U+00A9 and U+00AE.

The block has four standardized variants defined to specify emoji-style (U+FE0F VS16) or text presentation (U+FE0E VS15) for the
two emoji, both of which default to a text presentation.

History
The following Unicode-related documents record the purpose and process of defining specific characters in the Latin-1 Supplement block:

See also 
Phonetic symbols in Unicode

References

Latin-script Unicode blocks
Unicode blocks